Thomas Owens may refer to:

 Thomas L. Owens (1897–1948), U.S. Representative from Illinois
 Thomas Owens (sailor) (born 1938), Australian former sailor
 Tom Owens (born 1949), American basketball player